Jasmine Movement may refer to:
The Tunisian revolution in which President Zine El Abidine Ben Ali was forced out of the presidency by popular protests was called the "Jasmine Revolution" by many media organisations
The Arab Spring, which began with the Tunisian revolution, was also called the "Jasmine Revolution" by some
The 2011 Chinese pro-democracy protests in China that were inspired by the Tunisian revolution and was called the "Jasmine Revolution" by some of the organisers